Charles Hewett (born July 29, 1929) is a former American cyclist. He competed in the team pursuit at the 1960 Summer Olympics.

References

External links
 

1929 births
Living people
American male cyclists
Olympic cyclists of the United States
Cyclists at the 1960 Summer Olympics
Sportspeople from Boston
Pan American Games medalists in cycling
Pan American Games gold medalists for the United States
American track cyclists
Competitors at the 1959 Pan American Games
Cyclists from Massachusetts
Medalists at the 1959 Pan American Games